Independent church may refer to:

 A self-governed church
 National church, especially in Anglicanism and Orthodox Christianity, the organisation of that denomination within a given nation, which acts independently of the churches of the same denomination in other nations.
 Free church, as opposed to a state-sanctioned or established church
 Non-denominational church
 Independent (religion), as used in the 17th and 18th centuries
 a Congregational church, in particular
 Independent Church (Hoton), an 1832 schismatic sect of the Latter Day Saint movement, in Kirtland, Ohio, US

See also
 Autocephaly